Battle of the Planets is an American adaptation of the Japanese anime series Science Ninja Team Gatchaman (1972). Of the 105 original Gatchaman episodes, 85 were used in the Battle of the Planets adaptation, produced by Sandy Frank Entertainment. The adaptation was generally faithful to the plot and character development of the original Gatchaman series, but significant additions and reductions were made in order to increase appeal to the North American television market of the late 1970s, as well as avoid controversy from parents; these included the removal of elements of graphic violence and profanity.

It was the most successful anime series in the United States during the 1970s, airing on 100 network affiliates during after-school hours by 1979. As of June 2013, Sentai Filmworks have licensed the Gatchaman franchise. An oft-delayed CGI film based on the franchise, Gatchaman, last slated for a 2011 release from Warner Bros., was officially canceled in June 2011. However, a live-action Gatchaman feature film was released in Japan in August 2013. As of 2018, the series has been made available for streaming on Hidive.

Origins
In April 1977 Sandy Frank attended the MIP-TV conference in Cannes. It was here Frank first encountered the Japanese animation Gatchaman from producer Tatsunoko Production run by the Yoshida brothers. Frank committed to release the series in the U.S. after he saw the success of Star Wars in May 1977. Battle of the Planets is the title of the American adaptation of this series created by Frank. Frank authorized new footage and hired writers to add dialogue to fit the look of the animation, without reference to original scripts. Of the 105 original Gatchaman episodes, 85 were used in the Battle of the Planets adaptation produced by Sandy Frank Entertainment in 1978.

Summary
Battle of the Planets cast five young people as G-Force, consisting of Mark, Jason, Princess, Keyop, and Tiny. G-Force protects Earth from the planet Spectra and other attacks from beyond space. The most prominent field commander of the Spectra forces was a villainous, masked individual known as Zoltar. Zoltar would receive his orders directly from a being he would refer to as the "Luminous One". The Luminous One would appear as a ghost-like, disembodied, floating head. Who, or what, this being actually was, is never explained in any detail throughout the series.

The main ship of the G-Force team was called the Phoenix, which could carry, transport, and deploy four smaller vehicles, each operated by one team member. The four vehicles included a futuristic race car with various hidden weapons driven by Jason; this vehicle was concealed within the Phoenix's nosecone. The "galacti-cycle", a futuristic motorcycle Princess rode, was stored within the left-wing capsule of the Phoenix. Keyop's "Space Bubble", an all-terrain, tank-like vehicle capable of VTOL as well as being a submersible craft, was held in the right storage capsule of the Phoenix. And lastly, a futuristic jet fighter Mark pilots was stored in the top rear section of the Phoenix command island structure, and which used its tail fin to make up the center tail fin of the Phoenix. The fifth crew member, Tiny, was assigned to pilot the Phoenix rather than one of the detachable craft.

A regularly featured plot device was the transformation of the Phoenix into a flaming bird-shaped craft able to handle virtually any exceptional situation by functioning as a sort of giant, super blowtorch called the Fiery Phoenix. The Phoenix primary weapon was a supply of rockets called "TBX missiles" in the series. It also occasionally flaunted a powerful solar-powered energy blaster, although the team had the misfortune of choosing very cloudy days to use it.

The G-Force team themselves would use a combination of martial arts skills, ninja-like weapons, and their "cerebonic" powers to dispatch hordes of enemy soldiers and overcome other obstacles. Their bird-like costumes include wing-like capes that could fan out and function nearly identically to parachutes and/or wingsuits, enabling the G-Force members to drift or glide down to safety from heights that would otherwise prove fatal.

The G-Force members stay in contact through a wrist-band communicator device which also serves as a way for them to change or "transmute" instantly into their G-Force uniforms or back into their civilian clothes. Other weapons seen displayed by various team members include Mark's sonic boomerang, a bird-shaped boomerang with razor-sharp wings; Jason's and Tiny's multi-purpose gadget guns, which can be outfitted with grappling hook and line, drill bits, etc.; and Keyop's and Princess's yo-yo bombs, which could be used as bolas, darts, and explosive devices. Other weapons include feathers with a sharpened steel quill that could be used as deadly throwing darts and mini-grenades shaped like ball bearings with spike studs.

Subsequent versions 

In 1986, Gatchaman was re-worked in the US as G-Force: Guardians of Space by Turner, with a good deal of the original content edited out of Battle of the Planets put back into the show. It followed the plot of the original Gatchaman much more faithfully than Battle of the Planets because of this. Missing was Hoyt Curtin's original score. New voice acting was used.

Two soundtrack albums and several DVDs have been released.

The two Japanese follow-up series, Gatchaman II and Gatchaman Fighter, were combined into 65 episodes and released as the Saban-produced show Eagle Riders. All 65 episodes aired in Australia, but in the United States, only 13 episodes were aired.

Key changes in the adaptation 
The Battle of the Planets adaptation differs significantly from Gatchaman. The difference is due to heavy editing made to make the show appealing to the audience in the United States by removing controversial elements (i.e. graphic violence, profanity, and transgender characters) while adding elements reminiscent of the feature film Star Wars, which was popular at the time. In fact, the name "Battle of the Planets" was an attempt to associate itself with the popularity of Star Wars. While the original Gatchaman was earthbound, dark-toned, and environmentally themed, the adaptation morphed it into a child-friendly outer space show with robot characters, although some environmental themes were kept, and this is also why the other planets to which G-Force traveled on missions looked very much like Earth. Setting, violence, objectionable language, and most character fatalities were altered or eliminated by cutting scenes, dubbing, and explanatory voice-overs (for instance, claiming that the city had been evacuated before a battle scene that would show the incidental destruction of buildings and houses, as well as explaining away the destruction of the Earth armies and air forces as being robot tanks and fighter planes).

One of the most notable changes in the BotP adaptation involves the character Keyop (Jinpei in Gatchaman), who picked up a bizarre verbal tic of stuttering, chirping, and burbling every time he started to speak. There was a longstanding fan rumor that this was done because the original character spoke using much profanity and that Keyop's excess mouth motion would cover up deleting the words. This was not true, as demonstrated by the existence of an unedited Gatchaman version released by ADV Films in the US, in which Keyop rarely, if ever, used profanity. The in-story explanation for Keyop's unique manner of speech is that he is an artificial life form with a speech impediment because of slightly defective genetic engineering.

The main villain, known as Zoltar in BotP, had an unusual background due to the gender changing mutant nature of the original Berg Katse character. In an episode where Katse's female half was featured (BotP title: "The Galaxy Girls"), she was introduced as a separate character, Zoltar's sister, for BotP. (A hint of her actual nature was retained in the name she used when masquerading as a human, Mala Latroz—"Latroz" is an anagram of "Zoltar.")

To compensate for the other differences, a robot named 7-Zark-7—who watched over G-Force from their base, Center Neptune—performed explanatory voiceovers and light comic relief, which not only padded the time lost from editing but also filled in the gaps in the storyline. This device bears the influence of contemporary Star Wars film, with 7-Zark-7 having a visual appearance not dissimilar from R2-D2, and a somewhat camp personality in the style of C-3PO. Notionally, 7-Zark-7 ran the undersea monitoring station Center Neptune, from where he received information regarding incoming threats to Earth and relayed that information to G-Force. Zark and other added characters, such as 1-Rover-1, Zark's robotic dog (who could hover from one side of the control room to the other by spinning his tail like a propeller, Muttley-style) and Susan (the early-warning computer whose sultry feminine voice often sent Zark into ecstasy) added to the cartoon's youth appeal. Some additional footage was also animated showing G-Force members Mark and Princess (using their Gatchaman model sheets) interacting with Zark, as well putting an image of Mark on a video screen in the control room, helping his addition blend more smoothly into the existing Gatchaman footage (although there is a clear difference in quality between the Zark and the Gatchaman animation).

Voice cast
Apart from the pilot episode, Battle of the Planets featured a generic end credits sequence which only credited the regular cast, Alan Young, Casey Kasem, Janet Waldo, Ronnie Schell, Keye Luke and Alan Dinehart. But in addition to the regulars, several uncredited 'guest' performers voiced secondary characters in many of the episodes. These included Takayo Fischer, William Woodson (who was also the announcer for the opening titles, episode previews and trailers), Frank Maxwell, Edward Andrews, Wendy Young (daughter of Alan Young), and David Jolliffe (who also voiced Jason in the pilot.) The pilot episode featured a different end credits sequence which also credited Jolliffe, William Woodson and Alan Oppenheimer. It is unclear which character Oppenheimer voiced in the episode (it may have been Gorok, the episode's villain; or it may have been Chief Anderson, who was cut from the final version of the episode), and he never worked on the series again.

Regular Cast:
Alan Young as 7-Zark-7, Keyop, additional voices
Casey Kasem as Mark, additional voices
Ronnie Schell as Jason (regular voice), Tiny (episode 1), additional voices
Keye Luke as Zoltar, the Spirit, Cronos, additional voices
Janet Waldo as Princess, Susan, additional voices
Alan Dinehart as Tiny (regular voice), Anderson, additional voices

Additional voices provided by:
David Jolliffe Jason (episode 1), additional voices
William Woodson announcer, additional voices
Alan Oppenheimer additional voices, episode 1 only
Edward Andrews additional voices (uncredited)
Takayo Fischer additional voices (uncredited)
Frank Maxwell additional voices (uncredited)
Wendy Young additional voices (uncredited)

Episodes

TV movie
A TV movie called Battle of the Planets: The Movie was made by Gallerie International Films and Sandy Frank Film Syndication. David Bret Egen was the voice of 7-Zark-7. The movie was combined from several episodes to form a new storyline that contained violence as well as deaths. It was considered for an uncut remake of Battle of The Planets, but was scrapped when plans changed. Sandy Frank began focusing efforts on arranging an uncut dub of Gatchaman instead.

Comic books

Battle of the Planets was also released in comic book form, originally by Gold Key Comics, but later revamped by Top Cow Productions. Among the Top Cow comic books was Battle of the Planets: Princess, written by David Wohl with art by Wilson Tortosa, released in 2002. A Battle of the Planets comic strip ran in the British TV Comic. The TV Comic issues which feature the Battle of the Planets strip run from #1530 (17 April 1981) to #1671 (30 December 1983). TV Comic also reprinted some of the Gold Key stories for two Battle of the Planets holiday specials and one TV Comic holiday special. There was also a Battle of the Planets Annual which reprinted some of the Gold Key stories.

Soundtrack
Battle of the Planets track listing

Main Theme – Title Card
Dramatic Curtain
Ready Room 
Alien Trap
BP-Mysterioso 4 – BP-Mysterioso 3 – BP-Mysterioso 2
BP-Teenage Mysterioso
Love In The Afterburner
7-Zark-7's Song – Zarks Theme Alt – Zark Disco
Keyops 1 – Robot Hijinks
Firefight
BP-Orion Cue #1 – Orion 4 – BP-Orion Runs
Alien Planet
Two Monsters – Star Fight
Alien Trouble – More Alien Trouble
Space On Fire
Phoenix Raising
BP-108
BP-101 Alt – The Robot's Dog
BP-Sneak-Up – BP-Bad Guys
Return To The Alien Planet
BP-600 – BP600 A
BP-101 – BP-106 – BP-107 – BP-2002
Come Out, Come Out
BP-105 – BP-2001
Melting Jets
BP-Dialogue – BP-2025 – BP-Mysterious – BP-2020 – BP-2002
The Chief Alien Shows Up - Victory
Main Title With Voice Over
Emblem G
Spectra Visions
Like The Phoenix
Coral Reef
Crescent Moon
Holding Up A Shad
Zoltar, Fastening The Armor
Fighter G
Red Illusion
The Earth Is Alone!
A Vow To The Sky
Countdown
Fighting Phoenix
Space Chase
BP-1 Zark's Theme
Alien Planet
BP-1000
Space Mummy Trailer
Space Serpent Trailer
The Ghost Ship Of Planet Mir Trailer
The Luminous One (Promo Spot)
G-Force Vs. Zoltar (Promo Spot)
7-Zark-7 And Company (Promo Spot)
The Luminous One #2 (Promo Spot)
Commander Mark, Jason (Promo Spot)
Princess, Tiny, Keyop (Promo Spot)
Battle Of The Planes 04 (Remix) – Spray
The Ballad Of 7 Zark 7 (Remix) – Spray

Character variations

Team variations in different versions

Character variations across different versions

Other notable changes

‡The original Japanese-language version of Gatchaman contains a small amount of English.

Reception

In the United Kingdom, the show was voted #42 on Channel 4's 100 Greatest Kids' TV Shows in 2001.

The show was voted #62 on Channel 4's 100 Greatest Cartoons in 2004.

According to Wizard magazine, Battle of the Planets is considered to be one of the 100 greatest animated shows.

In 2009, IGN ranked BotP as the 44th-greatest animated show of all time in their Top 100 list.

Scrapped reboot
Battle of the Planets: Phoenix Ninjas (working title) was a planned animated reboot that would have been produced by Nelvana, d-rights and Tatsunoko. Aimed at 6- to 11-year-old boys, the project was conceived when d-rights expressed interest in Nelvana rebooting the franchise after the success the three saw with the second generation of Beyblade. There has been no new information on the project since 2016 and it appears to be scrapped.

American live-action film
It was announced at the San Diego Comic Con in July 2019 that Joe and Anthony Russo are producing a live-action Battle of the Planets film through their production company, AGBO, with the possibility of directing. On July 22, 2021, it was announced the Russo Brothers have brought Daniel Casey as the film's scriptwriter. In a video interview with AP Entertainment on July 1, 2022, Joe Russo said they are still working on the movie.

Further reading
 G-Force: Animated

References

External links

Gatchaman
1978 American television series debuts
1980 American television series endings
1970s American animated television series
1980s American animated television series
American children's animated action television series
American children's animated space adventure television series
American children's animated science fantasy television series
American children's animated superhero television series
American television series based on Japanese television series
English-language television shows
First-run syndicated television programs in the United States
Science fiction anime and manga
Tatsunoko Production
Television shows adapted into comics
Television shows adapted into films
Television shows adapted into video games
1970s American science fiction television series
1980s American science fiction television series